Rwan Philipe Rodrigues de Souza Cruz (born 20 May 2001), known as Rwan Seco or just Rwan, is a Brazilian footballer who plays as a forward for Santos.

Club career

Early career
Born in Cajueiro Seco, a small neighborhood in Jaboatão dos Guararapes, Pernambuco, Rwan began his career at a local footballing school named Garoto do Futuro before joining Náutico's youth categories. One year later, he joined Sport Recife as they offered a small funding assistance.

Rwan left Sport in the end of 2018 and subsequently signed for Figueirense, but spent nine months without playing at his new side due to a registration problem. He subsequently moved to Flamengo-SP, but returned to his hometown in March 2020 due to the COVID-19 pandemic, and helped his father as a bricklayer.

Santos
In June 2020, Rwan agreed to join Santos on loan from Flamengo, being initially assigned to the under-20s. However, due to the club's transfer ban, he was registered only in the following May.

Rwan spent the 2021 season playing for Santos' under-20 and under-23 sides, and signed a permanent three-year deal on 16 December of that year. He made his professional debut on 20 February 2022, coming on as a second-half substitute for Lucas Braga in a 0–3 Campeonato Paulista home loss against São Paulo.

Rwan scored his first senior goal on 23 February 2022, netting his team's third in a 3–0 away win over Salgueiro, for the year's Copa do Brasil.

Personal life
Rwan had a relationship with fellow footballer Thaís Regina. A central defender, she plays for Flamengo.

Career statistics

References

External links
Santos FC profile 

2001 births
Living people
People from Jaboatão dos Guararapes
Brazilian footballers
Association football forwards
Santos FC players
Sportspeople from Pernambuco
Campeonato Brasileiro Série A players
21st-century Brazilian people